El Atteuf  is a town and commune in Ghardaïa Province, Algeria. According to the 2008 census it has a population of 14,752, up from 12,713 in 1998,
 and an annual population growth rate of 1.5%.

Geography

El Atteuf lies on the banks of the Wadi Mzab, an intermittent river in the M'zab valley, downstream of Ghardaïa. The area has been listed as a UNESCO World Heritage Site. El Atteuf is the oldest town in the area.

Education

7.0% of the population has a tertiary education (the equal second highest in the province after Metlili), and another 16.6% has competed secondary education. The overall literacy rate is 89.4% (the highest in the province), and is 95.3% among males (equal highest in the province) and 83.2% among females (highest in the province).

Localities
The commune of El Atteuf is composed of four localities:

Vieux Ksar El Atteuf
Rezzag
El Argoub
Assedjlaf et la Palmeraie

References

Neighbouring towns and cities

Communes of Ghardaïa Province
Ghardaïa Province